The Order of St. George is an order of chivalry of the Russian Empire founded in 1769 by Catherine the Great.

The Order of Saint George or Order of St. George may also refer to:

Orders of chivalry 
 Order of Sant Jordi d'Alfama (Catalan for 'Saint George of Alfama'), an order founded in 1201 by King Peter II of Aragon
 Order of Saint George (Kingdom of Hungary), a secular chivalric order founded in 1326 by King Charles I of Hungary
 Order of Saint George (House of Habsburg), founded in 1469 by Frederick III, Holy Roman Emperor
  Sacred Military Constantinian Order of Saint George, a Catholic order of chivalry founded circa 1520 by the Angeli Comneni family
 , a related order that is associated with the House of Bourbon-Parma
  Royal Order of Saint George for the Defense of the Immaculate Conception, an order of the Kingdom of Bavaria founded in 1726 by Elector Maximilian II Emanuel
  Ancient Order of St. George, a Christian order of chivalry founded in 1768 by Philipp Ferdinand of Limburg-Stirum
  Order of St. George (Hanover), an order founded in 1839 by Ernest Augustus, King of Hanover
  Order of St. George (Habsburg-Lorraine)

Referring to Saint George and another saint 
  Order of St Michael and St George, a chivalric order founded in 1818 by George, Prince Regent, later George IV of the United Kingdom
  Order of Saints George and Constantine, an order founded in 1936 by the Greek royal family

Orders of merit 
  St. George's Order of Victory, an order of merit founded in 2004 by the Republic of Georgia
  Royal Military Order of St George, a military order of merit founded in 2009 by King George Tupou V of Tonga
 Saint George Award, top award of United States Armor Association of the United States Army

Other 
 Order of St. George (Fabergé egg), a jewelled enamelled Easter egg made under the supervision of the Russian jeweller Peter Carl Fabergé in 1916
 Order of St George (horse), a thoroughbred racehorse that won the 2015 Irish St Leger
 International Knightly Order Valiant of St George, a confraternity affiliated with the Royal Society of St George

See also
 Cross of St. George, a state decoration of the Russian Federation
 Order of the Garter, which also has St George as its patron
 Saint George (disambiguation)